Wendy Jane Crewson (born May 9, 1956) is a Canadian actress and producer. She began her career appearing on Canadian television, before her breakthrough role in 1991 dramatic film The Doctor.

Crewson has appeared in many Hollywood films, including The Good Son (1993), The Santa Clause (1994) and its sequels The Santa Clause 2 (2002) and The Santa Clause 3: The Escape Clause (2006), as well as Air Force One (1997), Bicentennial Man (1999), What Lies Beneath (2000), The 6th Day (2000), The Covenant (2006) and Eight Below (2006). She also starred in a number of independent movies, such as Better Than Chocolate (1999), Suddenly Naked (2001), Perfect Pie (2002), Away from Her (2006), Into the Forest (2015) and Room (2015).

Crewson has won six Gemini Awards, two Canadian Screen Awards and ACTRA Award for her performances on television. She played leading roles in a number of television films, include playing Joanne Kilbourn in six movies based on novels by Gail Bowen. She had recurring roles on American television series 24 and Revenge, and the Canadian television series Frankie Drake Mysteries. From 2012 to 2017, Crewson co-starred in the CTV medical drama Saving Hope.

Early life
Crewson was born in Hamilton, Ontario, the daughter of June Doreen (née Thomas) and Robert Binnie Crewson. She attended John Rennie High School in Pointe-Claire, Québec, as did her younger brother, Brad Crewson.

She attended Queen's University in Kingston, Ontario, where she won the Lorne Greene Award for outstanding work in the theater. She then studied at the Webber Douglas Academy of Dramatic Art in London.

Career
When she returned to Canada, Crewson landed a leading role in the television movie War Brides (1980) directed by Martin Lavut, for which she received her first ACTRA Award nomination. From 1980 to 1983, she starred in the CBC drama series, Home Fires, a family saga set in Toronto during World War II. For the final season, she won ACTRA Award for Best Actress in a Drama Series in 1984. In 1982, she made her American debut starring alongside Tom Hanks in the television drama film Mazes and Monsters.

During 1980s, Crewson appeared in a number of Canadian television productions, including a recurring roles on Night Heat and Street Legal, and several television films. She was lead actress in two short lived American drama series: Hard Copy (CBS, 1987), and Studio 5-B (ABC, 1989). In 1988, she starred in the HBO political mockumentary miniseriesTanner '88 directed by Robert Altman, and in 1990 starred in Getting Married in Buffalo Jump, for which she was nominated for Gemini Award for Best Performance by an Actress in a Leading Role in a Dramatic Program or Mini-Series. She also received Gemini Awards nomination for I'll Never Get to Heaven (1992), A Killing Spring (2002), Sex Traffic (2004), The Robber Bride (2007), and The Summit (2008), and won for At the End of the Day: The Sue Rodriguez Story (1999), The Many Trials of One Jane Doe (2002), and The Man Who Lost Himself (2005). Crewson also won Gemini Awards for guest starring in Due South  in 1998, and supporting role in ReGenesis in 2007.

In 1991, Crewson appeared in her first breakthrough role in the American drama film The Doctor starring William Hurt. The following year, she starred opposite Tom Selleck in the comedy-drama Folks!, the film was panned by critics and grossed only $6 million. In 1993, she starred in the psychological thriller The Good Son (1993), and in 1994 appeared opposite Whoopi Goldberg in Corrina, Corrina. Also in 1994, Crewson starred alongside Tim Allen in the financially successful Christmas comedy film The Santa Clause. The film grossed $189 million and its two sequels, The Santa Clause 2 (2002) and The Santa Clause 3: The Escape Clause (2006) also grossed $283 million worldwide together.

In 1996, Crewson co-starred in the romantic drama film To Gillian on Her 37th Birthday as Peter Gallagher's unfortunate blind date, and the following year played Grace Marshall, First Lady to President James Marshall (Harrison Ford) in the political thriller Air Force One directed by Wolfgang Petersen. She also appeared in Gang Related (1997), played a leading role in Sleeping Dogs Lie (1998),  and co-starred opposite Robin Williams in the science fiction film Bicentennial Man (1999). In 2000, she played Arnold Schwarzenegger's wife in The 6th Day, and appeared in What Lies Beneath. She also appeared in Between Strangers (2002), The Clearing (2004), Eight Below (2006), The Covenant (2006), Academy Award-nominated Away from Her (2006), The Seeker (2007), Winnie Mandela (2011), Antiviral (2012), Into the Forest, Room (2015), Kodachrome (2017), and On the Basis of Sex (2018).

Crewson starred in independent movies Better Than Chocolate (1999) and Suddenly Naked (2001), both directed by Anne Wheeler. In 2002, she starred in drama film Perfect Pie, for which she received ACTRA Award nomination. She had leading roles in a number of made for television movies. She starred opposite Robert Urich in Lifetime movies Spenser: The Judas Goat (1994) and Spenser: A Savage Place(1995), and opposite Susan Lucci in Ebbie (1995). In 1998, she played Faye Stafford, wife of Thomas Stafford, in the Sally Field-directed episode of HBO miniseries From the Earth to the Moon. Other credits including Lives of Girls & Women (1996), Summer's End (1999), The Matthew Shepard Story (2002), An Unexpected Love (2003), Twelve Mile Road (2003), and The Path to 9/11 (2006). From 2000 to 2002, she played Joanne Kilbourn, a single mom of three and an ex-cop who teaches criminology and solves crimes in her spare time, in six movies based on novels by Gail Bowen.

In 2003, Crewson took a recurring role as Dr. Anne Packard, personal physician and love interest to the President, of the third season of Fox drama series 24. From 2006 to 2010, she hosted W Network series Crimes of Passion, and from 2007 to 2008 starred on the Canadian science-fiction series ReGenesis as Dr. Rachel Woods. She later guest-starred on Flashpoint, Rookie Blue, CSI: Crime Scene Investigation and Murdoch Mysteries. From 2012 to 2013, she had a recurring role during the second season of ABC primetime soap opera Revenge playing villainous Helen Crowley. Also in 2012, Crewson began playing Dr. Dana Kinny in the CTV medical drama Saving Hope, for which she received Canadian Screen Award for Best Supporting Actress in a Drama Program or Series in 2013. The series ended in 2017. Also in 2017, she won another Canadian Screen Award for Best Supporting Actress for her recurring role on Slasher.

In 2015, Crewson was inducted to Canada's Walk of Fame. In 2016, she received the Earle Grey Award, which recognizes actors for their contributions to the international profile of Canadian TV or for their significant body of work.

From 2017 to 2021, Crewson played a recurring role lead character's mother and assisting her in investigations in the CBC drama series, Frankie Drake Mysteries. She received two nominations for Canadian Screen Award for Best Guest Performance, Drama Series. Also that time, she had a recurring role on the CBC sitcom Workin' Moms, receiving another Canadian Screen Award nomination in 2020. In 2018, she starred in the CTV crime drama series, The Detail, for which she was nominated for a Canadian Screen Award for Best Actress in a Continuing Leading Dramatic Role. In 2019, she starred in the Hallmark series When Hope Calls, and in 2020 starred in the Netflix horror series October Faction. In 2021, she starred in the second season of Peacock series Departure, and in 2022 starred as title character' mother in the CBS medical drama Good Sam. She later was cast in the third season of CBC Television police drama Pretty Hard Cases and the internationally produced thriller Gray.

Personal life
She married actor Michael Murphy in 1988, and they have two children. They divorced in January 2009, but remain friends and worked together on the film Fall (2014).

Crewson came out publicly as lesbian in December 2014, and revealed to the press that she had come out to her family years earlier. In 2015, it was reported that Crewson dated Julie Bristow, president of Bristow Global Media in Canada.
 
She resides in Rosedale, Toronto.

Filmography

Film

Television films

Television series

References

External links

 
 

Canadian film actresses
Canadian television actresses
20th-century Canadian actresses
21st-century Canadian actresses
Best Supporting Actress in a Drama Series Canadian Screen Award winners
Living people
Queen's University at Kingston alumni
Actresses from Hamilton, Ontario
Canadian lesbian actresses
Canadian expatriate actresses in the United States
1956 births
21st-century Canadian LGBT people
20th-century Canadian LGBT people